Mapla Singam ( Lion Groom) is a 2016 Indian Tamil-language romantic comedy film directed by Rajasekhar. The film stars Vimal and Anjali, with Soori in a supporting role. Don Ashok has penned the dialogs. N. R. Raghunanthan has scored the music, whereas cinematography was done by V. S. Tharun Balaji and editing by Vivek Harshan. The film released on 11 March 2016.

Plot
Sevagapandian (Radha Ravi) is a politician leading his life with his only daughter Vinodhini (Madhumila) and his nephew Anbuchelvan (Vimal). Anbu accompanies Sevagapandian in his political meetings and treats his cousin Vinodhini as his own sister. Vinodhini falls in love with Satish (Vishnu) and discloses this to Anbu, requesting to convince Sevagapandian. Anbu waits for the right time to disclose about Vinodhini's love to Sevagapandian. Meanwhile, Anbu falls in love with Sailaja (Anjali), who happens to be Satish's sister, for which she reciprocates as well.

Sevagapandian is against love marriages and starts looking for an alliance for Vinodhini. Vinodhini requests her father to postpone her wedding for a few years as she prefers to get employed, for which Sevagapandian refuses. Vinodhini goes missing and everyone assumes that she has eloped with Satish. Sevagapandian and his henchmen thrashes Satish's home leaving their family members insulted. However, it is revealed that Vinodhini has gone to Coimbatore for a job interview. Anbu feels bad for Sevagapandian's behavior and apologizes to Shailaja.

Sevagapandian speeds up Vinodhini's marriage arrangements and Vinodhini decides to marry Satish in a register office. Anbu understands Vinodhini's situation and agrees to help her. Vinodhini marries Satish. Sevagapandian gets furious and informs Anbu to revenge Satish family by marrying Shailaja, not knowing the fact that Anbu and Shailaja are in love already. Anbu uses this opportunity and marries Shailaja.

Cast 

 Vimal as Anbuchelvan
 Anjali as Sailaja
 Soori as Anbuchelvan's friend 
 Kaali Venkat as Anbuchelvan's friend 
 Radha Ravi as Sevagapandian, Anbu's uncle
 Pandiarajan as District Collector
 Adam Greig as Bill
 G. Gnanasambandam as Anbu's father
 Meera Krishnan as Anbu's mother
 Jayaprakash as Sailaja's father
 Vanitha Krishnachandran as Sailaja's mother
 Madhumila as Vinodhini, Anbu's sister
 Vishnu as Satish, Anbu's brother-in-law
 Ramdoss as Mahesh Babu
 Vidyullekha Raman as Selvi
 G. Marimuthu as Elamaran
 Swaminathan as Mama
 Yogi Babu
 Mayilsamy
 Manobala
 Singamuthu
 Rajendranath as Inspector Thangavel
 Supergood Subramani as Marriage Broker
 Usilai Ganesh as Usilai
 Rajesh Gopalan
 Radha
 Pulipandi
 Thenali
 Aravaan Murugan
 Baba Bhaskar (special appearance in the song "Vandhaaru Vandhaaru")

Production 
Escape Artists Motion Pictures announced that they would fund a film to be directed by Rajasekhar, an erstwhile assistant of Ezhil. The film began production in November 2014, with a photo shoot taking place with Vimal, Anjali and Soori. A Scottish pianist, working at A.R.Rahman's KM Music Conservatory, Adam Greig, was selected to portray a foreigner in the film, featuring in comedy scenes alongside Soori.

Soundtrack
The music was composed by N. R. Raghunanthan.

Reception
Times of India gave the movie 3 stars stating " Two warring groups in a village, romance that blossoms between the youngsters in these groups, and a happy ending! Before you say 'Yawn!', here's the news. Mapla Singam is actually not bad. The film seems to have been cut from the same cloth as films like Varuthapadatha Valibar Sangam. Sivakarthikeyan has made a career out of these films, and Vemal's attempts have largely gone unnoticed. Perhaps this one could do the magic."

References

External links

2016 films
2010s Tamil-language films
Indian comedy films
2016 directorial debut films